This article details the Castleford Tigers rugby league football club's 2015 season. This is the Tigers 8th consecutive season in the Super League. Castleford were last season's Challenge Cup runner's up.

Pre season friendlies

Castleford score is first.

Table

2015 fixtures and results

2015 Super League Fixtures

2015 Super 8's

Player appearances
Super League Only

 = Injured

 = Suspended

Challenge Cup

Player appearances
Challenge Cup Games only

2015 squad statistics

 Appearances and Points include (Super League, Challenge Cup and Play-offs) as of 25 September 2015.

 = Injured
 = Suspended

2015 transfers in/out

In

Out

References

External links
Castleford Tigers Website
Castleford Tigers - SL Website

Castleford Tigers seasons
Castleford Tigers season